Roko maršas (The March of Rock) was a rock music festival, organized in various cities of Lithuania. It was held in 1987–1989. It was resurrected in 1996 and 1997. The first festivals were organized while Lithuania was still part of the Soviet Union. They became part of the Singing Revolution, spreading ideas of the Lithuanian independence movement among the youth. It helped to awaken the younger generation from Soviet-era apathy and inspire them. In total, the three first festivals attracted an estimated 130,000 spectators. The festivals became a rehearsal for the mass protest rallies by the Sąjūdis that lead to the declaration of Lithuania's independence in March 1990.

The idea for the festival was raised by Algirdas Kaušpėdas, leader of the band Antis, after a successful concert Kažkas atsitiko (Something Happened) in 1986. The event encouraged various underground bands to become public. The festival toured cities in Lithuania. The first installment in 1987 focused more on music without an obvious political message while later installments had clear political agendas.

Festivals

References

Rock festivals in Lithuania
Recurring events disestablished in 1997
Music festivals in Lithuania
1987 establishments in Lithuania
Lithuanian Soviet Socialist Republic
Singing Revolution
Music festivals established in 1987